Oliver Zhang or Eichu Cho (born November 21, 1997) is a Canadian-Japanese ice dancer. With his skating partner, Rikako Fukase, he is the 2020 NHK Trophy silver medalist and a two-time Japanese national medalist. They competed in the final segment at the 2020 Four Continents Championships.

Programs

With Fukase

With Roy

Competitive highlights 
GP: Grand Prix; CS: Challenger Series

With Fukase

With Roy

References

External links 
 
 

1997 births
Living people
Japanese male ice dancers
Canadian male ice dancers
Figure skaters from Montreal